The 1918 Pittsburgh Pirates season was the 37th season of the Pittsburgh Pirates franchise; the 32nd in the National League. The Pirates finished fourth in the league standings with a record of 65–60.

Regular season

Season standings

Record vs. opponents

Game log

|- bgcolor="ffbbbb"
| 1 || April 16 || @ Reds || 0–2 || Schneider || Cooper (0–1) || — || — || 0–1
|- bgcolor="ccffcc"
| 2 || April 17 || @ Reds || 8–1 || Hamilton (1–0) || Regan || — || — || 1–1
|- bgcolor="ffbbbb"
| 3 || April 18 || @ Reds || 6–7 || Conley || Harmon (0–1) || — || — || 1–2
|- bgcolor="ccffcc"
| 4 || April 22 || @ Cardinals || 5–1 || Hamilton (2–0) || Packard || — || — || 2–2
|- bgcolor="ffbbbb"
| 5 || April 23 || @ Cardinals || 5–6 || May || Sanders (0–1) || — || — || 2–3
|- bgcolor="ccffcc"
| 6 || April 25 || Reds || 1–0 || Miller (1–0) || Schneider || — || — || 3–3
|- bgcolor="ccffcc"
| 7 || April 26 || Reds || 7–1 || Hamilton (3–0) || Eller || — || — || 4–3
|- bgcolor="ffbbbb"
| 8 || April 27 || Reds || 2–4 || Bressler || Sanders (0–2) || — || — || 4–4
|-

|- bgcolor="ffbbbb"
| 9 || May 1 || @ Cubs || 3–5 || Vaughn || Carlson (0–1) || — || — || 4–5
|- bgcolor="ccffcc"
| 10 || May 2 || Cardinals || 1–0 || Hamilton (4–0) || Ames || — || — || 5–5
|- bgcolor="ffbbbb"
| 11 || May 3 || Cardinals || 2–6 || Doak || Miller (1–1) || — || — || 5–6
|- bgcolor="ccffcc"
| 12 || May 4 || Cardinals || 5–4 (10) || Cooper (1–1) || Sherdel || — || — || 6–6
|- bgcolor="ffbbbb"
| 13 || May 5 || @ Reds || 1–3 || Toney || Jacobs (0–1) || — || — || 6–7
|- bgcolor="ccffcc"
| 14 || May 5 || @ Reds || 4–3 || Harmon (1–1) || Schneider || Steele (1) || — || 7–7
|- bgcolor="ccffcc"
| 15 || May 6 || Cubs || 7–2 || Hamilton (5–0) || Hendrix || — || — || 8–7
|- bgcolor="ccffcc"
| 16 || May 7 || Cubs || 2–1 || Miller (2–1) || Weaver || — || — || 9–7
|- bgcolor="ffbbbb"
| 17 || May 8 || Cubs || 1–8 || Tyler || Cooper (1–2) || — || — || 9–8
|- bgcolor="ffbbbb"
| 18 || May 9 || Cubs || 2–6 || Vaughn || Sanders (0–3) || — || — || 9–9
|- bgcolor="ccffcc"
| 19 || May 10 || Giants || 4–2 || Hamilton (6–0) || Benton || — || — || 10–9
|- bgcolor="ccffcc"
| 20 || May 11 || Giants || 2–0 || Cooper (2–2) || Sallee || — || 13,000 || 11–9
|- bgcolor="ffbbbb"
| 21 || May 14 || Giants || 2–3 || Barnes || Miller (2–2) || — || — || 11–10
|- bgcolor="ffbbbb"
| 22 || May 15 || Robins || 1–5 || Marquard || Cooper (2–3) || — || — || 11–11
|- bgcolor="ccffcc"
| 23 || May 16 || Robins || 4–3 || Sanders (1–3) || Coombs || — || — || 12–11
|- bgcolor="ffbbbb"
| 24 || May 17 || Robins || 4–7 || Cheney || Harmon (1–2) || — || — || 12–12
|- bgcolor="ccffcc"
| 25 || May 18 || Robins || 11–4 || Miller (3–2) || Griner || — || 4,000 || 13–12
|- bgcolor="ccffcc"
| 26 || May 20 || Phillies || 5–1 || Cooper (3–3) || Prendergast || — || — || 14–12
|- bgcolor="ccffcc"
| 27 || May 22 || Phillies || 6–5 (12) || Cooper (4–3) || Oeschger || — || — || 15–12
|- bgcolor="ffbbbb"
| 28 || May 23 || Phillies || 2–3 || Mayer || Miller (3–3) || — || — || 15–13
|- bgcolor="ffbbbb"
| 29 || May 24 || Braves || 3–6 || Ragan || Steele (0–1) || — || — || 15–14
|- bgcolor="ffbbbb"
| 30 || May 27 || Braves || 1–2 || Nehf || Cooper (4–4) || — || — || 15–15
|- bgcolor="ffbbbb"
| 31 || May 28 || Braves || 2–6 || Hearn || Sanders (1–4) || — || — || 15–16
|- bgcolor="ccffcc"
| 32 || May 30 || Cardinals || 8–0 || Miller (4–3) || Packard || — || — || 16–16
|- bgcolor="ffbbbb"
| 33 || May 30 || Cardinals || 0–4 || Doak || Harmon (1–3) || — || — || 16–17
|- bgcolor="ccffcc"
| 34 || May 31 || Cardinals || 12–7 || Steele (1–1) || Horstmann || Sanders (1) || — || 17–17
|-

|- bgcolor="ffbbbb"
| 35 || June 1 || @ Giants || 0–2 || Perritt || Cooper (4–5) || — || — || 17–18
|- bgcolor="ccffcc"
| 36 || June 3 || @ Giants || 3–2 || Miller (5–3) || Tesreau || — || — || 18–18
|- bgcolor="ffbbbb"
| 37 || June 4 || @ Giants || 1–2 || Sallee || Harmon (1–4) || — || — || 18–19
|- bgcolor="ffbbbb"
| 38 || June 5 || @ Giants || 3–4 || Causey || Cooper (4–6) || — || — || 18–20
|- bgcolor="ffbbbb"
| 39 || June 6 || @ Robins || 0–1 || Marquard || Sanders (1–5) || — || — || 18–21
|- bgcolor="ccffcc"
| 40 || June 8 || @ Robins || 7–1 || Miller (6–3) || Cheney || — || — || 19–21
|- bgcolor="ffbbbb"
| 41 || June 8 || @ Robins || 1–2 (12) || Coombs || Sanders (1–6) || — || — || 19–22
|- bgcolor="ffbbbb"
| 42 || June 10 || @ Robins || 0–2 || Grimes || Cooper (4–7) || — || — || 19–23
|- bgcolor="ccffcc"
| 43 || June 11 || @ Braves || 3–2 (16) || Sanders (2–6) || Hearn || — || — || 20–23
|- bgcolor="ffbbbb"
| 44 || June 12 || @ Braves || 0–1 || Fillingim || Miller (6–4) || — || — || 20–24
|- bgcolor="ffbbbb"
| 45 || June 13 || @ Braves || 1–2 || Nehf || Harmon (1–5) || — || — || 20–25
|- bgcolor="ffbbbb"
| 46 || June 14 || @ Braves || 6–7 || Rudolph || Cooper (4–8) || — || — || 20–26
|- bgcolor="ffbbbb"
| 47 || June 15 || @ Phillies || 1–6 || Oeschger || Sanders (2–7) || — || — || 20–27
|- bgcolor="ffbbbb"
| 48 || June 17 || @ Phillies || 8–9 (10) || Watson || Steele (1–2) || — || — || 20–28
|- bgcolor="ffbbbb"
| 49 || June 18 || @ Phillies || 0–1 || Hogg || Cooper (4–9) || — || — || 20–29
|- bgcolor="ffbbbb"
| 50 || June 19 || Cubs || 0–1 || Douglas || Harmon (1–6) || — || — || 20–30
|- bgcolor="ccffcc"
| 51 || June 20 || Cubs || 3–1 || Sanders (3–7) || Hendrix || Cooper (1) || — || 21–30
|- bgcolor="ccffcc"
| 52 || June 21 || Cubs || 3–0 || Steele (2–2) || Tyler || — || — || 22–30
|- bgcolor="ffbbbb"
| 53 || June 22 || Cubs || 2–5 || Vaughn || Cooper (4–10) || — || — || 22–31
|- bgcolor="ccffcc"
| 54 || June 23 || @ Reds || 4–1 || Mayer (1–0) || Toney || — || — || 23–31
|- bgcolor="ccffcc"
| 55 || June 23 || @ Reds || 15–1 || Harmon (2–6) || Toney || — || — || 24–31
|- bgcolor="ccffcc"
| 56 || June 24 || @ Reds || 7–2 || Miller (7–4) || Schneider || — || — || 25–31
|- bgcolor="ccffcc"
| 57 || June 27 || @ Cardinals || 4–3 || Cooper (5–10) || Doak || — || — || 26–31
|- bgcolor="ffbbbb"
| 58 || June 28 || @ Cardinals || 1–8 || Meadows || Harmon (2–7) || — || — || 26–32
|- bgcolor="ccffcc"
| 59 || June 29 || @ Cardinals || 5–1 || Mayer (2–0) || Johnson || — || — || 27–32
|- bgcolor="ffbbbb"
| 60 || June 29 || @ Cardinals || 4–5 || Sherdel || Miller (7–5) || — || — || 27–33
|- bgcolor="ffbbbb"
| 61 || June 30 || @ Cardinals || 1–2 || Ames || Steele (2–3) || — || — || 27–34
|- bgcolor="ccffcc"
| 62 || June 30 || @ Cardinals || 5–4 (11) || Cooper (6–10) || Doak || — || — || 28–34
|-

|- bgcolor="ccffcc"
| 63 || July 2 || Reds || 7–6 (10) || Cooper (7–10) || Regan || — || — || 29–34
|- bgcolor="ccffcc"
| 64 || July 3 || Reds || 8–5 || Comstock (1–0) || Schneider || Cooper (2) || — || 30–34
|- bgcolor="ccffcc"
| 65 || July 4 || Reds || 1–0 (11) || Sanders (4–7) || Ring || — || — || 31–34
|- bgcolor="ccffcc"
| 66 || July 4 || Reds || 8–4 || Cooper (8–10) || Eller || — || — || 32–34
|- bgcolor="ccffcc"
| 67 || July 5 || Giants || 10–4 || Slapnicka (1–0) || Schupp || — || — || 33–34
|- bgcolor="ccffcc"
| 68 || July 6 || Braves || 17–1 || Mayer (3–0) || Rudolph || — || — || 34–34
|- bgcolor="ccffcc"
| 69 || July 6 || Braves || 5–4 || Sanders (5–7) || Fillingim || Comstock (1) || — || 35–34
|- bgcolor="ffbbbb"
| 70 || July 8 || Braves || 0–5 || Ragan || Comstock (1–1) || — || — || 35–35
|- bgcolor="ccffcc"
| 71 || July 9 || Braves || 7–2 || Cooper (9–10) || Fillingim || — || — || 36–35
|- bgcolor="ffbbbb"
| 72 || July 10 || Giants || 4–9 || Demaree || Slapnicka (1–1) || — || — || 36–36
|- bgcolor="ccffcc"
| 73 || July 11 || Giants || 5–4 || Mayer (4–0) || Smith || — || — || 37–36
|- bgcolor="ccffcc"
| 74 || July 13 || Giants || 5–4 || Cooper (10–10) || Perritt || — || — || 38–36
|- bgcolor="ffbbbb"
| 75 || July 13 || Giants || 1–8 || Causey || Sanders (5–8) || — || — || 38–37
|- bgcolor="ccffcc"
| 76 || July 15 || Robins || 6–5 || Mayer (5–0) || Marquard || — || — || 39–37
|- bgcolor="ccffcc"
| 77 || July 16 || Robins || 7–6 || Cooper (11–10) || Grimes || — || — || 40–37
|- bgcolor="ccffcc"
| 78 || July 17 || Robins || 5–4 (11) || Cooper (12–10) || Robertson || — || — || 41–37
|- bgcolor="ffbbbb"
| 79 || July 18 || Phillies || 0–1 (13) || Jacobs || Slapnicka (1–2) || — || — || 41–38
|- bgcolor="ccffcc"
| 80 || July 19 || Phillies || 3–2 || Comstock (2–1) || Oeschger || — || — || 42–38
|- bgcolor="ccffcc"
| 81 || July 20 || Phillies || 1–0 || Mayer (6–0) || Hogg || — || — || 43–38
|- bgcolor="ffbbbb"
| 82 || July 20 || Phillies || 2–3 || Prendergast || Cooper (12–11) || — || — || 43–39
|- bgcolor="ccffcc"
| 83 || July 22 || Braves || 7–2 || Sanders (6–8) || Nehf || Cooper (3) || — || 44–39
|- bgcolor="ccffcc"
| 84 || July 24 || @ Robins || 3–1 || Comstock (3–1) || Marquard || — || — || 45–39
|- bgcolor="ffbbbb"
| 85 || July 25 || @ Robins || 0–10 || Grimes || Slapnicka (1–3) || — || — || 45–40
|- bgcolor="ffbbbb"
| 86 || July 25 || @ Robins || 2–6 || Coombs || Cooper (12–12) || — || — || 45–41
|- bgcolor="ffbbbb"
| 87 || July 26 || @ Robins || 3–4 || Cheney || Sanders (6–9) || — || — || 45–42
|- bgcolor="ccffcc"
| 88 || July 27 || @ Giants || 8–4 || Miller (8–5) || Demaree || Comstock (2) || — || 46–42
|- bgcolor="ccffcc"
| 89 || July 29 || @ Giants || 4–2 || Cooper (13–12) || Perritt || — || — || 47–42
|- bgcolor="ffbbbb"
| 90 || July 31 || @ Giants || 0–1 || Causey || Comstock (3–2) || — || — || 47–43
|- bgcolor="ccffcc"
| 91 || July 31 || @ Giants || 4–2 || Adams (1–0) || Steele || — || — || 48–43
|-

|- bgcolor="ccffcc"
| 92 || August 1 || @ Braves || 2–0 (21) || Cooper (14–12) || Nehf || — || — || 49–43
|- bgcolor="ffbbbb"
| 93 || August 2 || @ Braves || 2–4 || Northrop || Miller (8–6) || — || 2,500 || 49–44
|- bgcolor="ccffcc"
| 94 || August 3 || @ Braves || 4–3 || Comstock (4–2) || George || — || — || 50–44
|- bgcolor="ffbbbb"
| 95 || August 5 || @ Braves || 0–1 || Rudolph || Adams (1–1) || — || — || 50–45
|- bgcolor="ccffcc"
| 96 || August 6 || @ Phillies || 10–2 || Cooper (15–12) || Prendergast || — || — || 51–45
|- bgcolor="ccffcc"
| 97 || August 7 || @ Phillies || 4–2 || Mayer (7–0) || Watson || — || 1,000 || 52–45
|- bgcolor="ffbbbb"
| 98 || August 8 || @ Phillies || 1–6 || Hogg || Comstock (4–3) || — || — || 52–46
|- bgcolor="ffbbbb"
| 99 || August 8 || @ Phillies || 2–8 || Jacobs || Slapnicka (1–4) || — || — || 52–47
|- bgcolor="ccffcc"
| 100 || August 9 || Reds || 4–3 || Hill (1–0) || Schneider || — || — || 53–47
|- bgcolor="ffffff"
| 101 || August 10 || Cubs || 3–3 (10) ||  ||  || — || 10,000 || 53–47
|- bgcolor="ffbbbb"
| 102 || August 11 || @ Cubs || 3–5 || Douglas || Comstock (4–4) || — || — || 53–48
|- bgcolor="ccffcc"
| 103 || August 11 || @ Cubs || 6–3 || Mayer (8–0) || Vaughn || — || — || 54–48
|- bgcolor="ccffcc"
| 104 || August 12 || @ Cubs || 12–1 || Hill (2–0) || Martin || — || — || 55–48
|- bgcolor="ffbbbb"
| 105 || August 13 || @ Cubs || 1–2 || Tyler || Cooper (15–13) || — || — || 55–49
|- bgcolor="ccffcc"
| 106 || August 13 || @ Cubs || 7–2 || Miller (9–6) || Douglas || — || — || 56–49
|- bgcolor="ffbbbb"
| 107 || August 14 || @ Cubs || 0–2 || Vaughn || Comstock (4–5) || — || 2,000 || 56–50
|- bgcolor="ccffcc"
| 108 || August 15 || Robins || 3–1 || Cooper (16–13) || Smith || — || — || 57–50
|- bgcolor="ffbbbb"
| 109 || August 16 || Robins || 1–5 || Cheney || Mayer (8–1) || — || — || 57–51
|- bgcolor="ffbbbb"
| 110 || August 17 || Robins || 0–2 || Grimes || Hill (2–1) || — || 8,000 || 57–52
|- bgcolor="ccffcc"
| 111 || August 17 || Robins || 2–1 || Miller (10–6) || Robertson || — || 8,000 || 58–52
|- bgcolor="ccffcc"
| 112 || August 19 || Giants || 8–1 || Comstock (5–5) || Causey || — || — || 59–52
|- bgcolor="ffbbbb"
| 113 || August 19 || Giants || 1–2 || Toney || Cooper (16–14) || — || — || 59–53
|- bgcolor="ccffcc"
| 114 || August 20 || Giants || 10–2 || Mayer (9–1) || Steele || — || — || 60–53
|- bgcolor="ccffcc"
| 115 || August 21 || Braves || 3–2 || Miller (11–6) || Nehf || — || — || 61–53
|- bgcolor="ccffcc"
| 116 || August 22 || Braves || 3–0 || Sanders (7–9) || Rudolph || — || — || 62–53
|- bgcolor="ffbbbb"
| 117 || August 23 || Braves || 0–5 || Northrop || Hill (2–2) || — || — || 62–54
|- bgcolor="ccffcc"
| 118 || August 24 || Phillies || 4–3 || Cooper (17–14) || Jacobs || — || — || 63–54
|- bgcolor="ffbbbb"
| 119 || August 24 || Phillies || 4–7 || Hogg || Mayer (9–2) || — || — || 63–55
|- bgcolor="ffbbbb"
| 120 || August 27 || Phillies || 6–7 || Prendergast || Comstock (5–6) || Hogg || — || 63–56
|- bgcolor="ffbbbb"
| 121 || August 27 || Phillies || 2–8 || Watson || Miller (11–7) || — || — || 63–57
|- bgcolor="ccffcc"
| 122 || August 29 || Cardinals || 1–0 || Cooper (18–14) || Doak || — || — || 64–57
|- bgcolor="ffbbbb"
| 123 || August 29 || Cardinals || 1–4 || Sherdel || Mayer (9–3) || — || — || 64–58
|-

|- bgcolor="ffbbbb"
| 124 || September 1 || @ Cubs || 0–4 || Tyler || Hill (2–3) || — || — || 64–59
|- bgcolor="ffbbbb"
| 125 || September 2 || Cubs || 3–4 || Martin || Miller (11–8) || — || 4,000 || 64–60
|- bgcolor="ccffcc"
| 126 || September 2 || Cubs || 3–2 || Cooper (19–14) || Hendrix || — || 9,000 || 65–60
|-

|-
| Legend:       = Win       = Loss       = TieBold = Pirates team member

Opening Day lineup

Roster

Player stats

Batting

Starters by position 
Note: Pos = Position; G = Games played; AB = At bats; H = Hits; Avg. = Batting average; HR = Home runs; RBI = Runs batted in

Other batters 
Note: G = Games played; AB = At bats; H = Hits; Avg. = Batting average; HR = Home runs; RBI = Runs batted in

Pitching

Starting pitchers 
Note: G = Games pitched; IP = Innings pitched; W = Wins; L = Losses; ERA = Earned run average; SO = Strikeouts

Other pitchers 
Note: G = Games pitched; IP = Innings pitched; W = Wins; L = Losses; ERA = Earned run average; SO = Strikeouts

References

External links
 1918 Pittsburgh Pirates team page at Baseball Reference
 1918 Pittsburgh Pirates Page at Baseball Almanac

Pittsburgh Pirates seasons
Pittsburgh Pirates season
Pitts